These are the Florida State Seminoles football annual team award recipients.

Bob Crenshaw and Monk Bonasorte awards

The Tallahassee Quarterback Club sponsors an award, known as the Bob Crenshaw Award that is given in memory of a special Seminole football player whose courage and fighting spirit was an inspiration to others.

The award is given in the memory of Robert E. (Bob) Crenshaw who played football from 1952 to 1955. The 175 pounds offensive lineman was the captain of the team in 1954 and a student leader. He was killed in a jet crash in 1958. The plaque's inscription reads: "To the football player with the Biggest Heart." The recipient is chosen by his teammates as the man who best exemplifies the qualities that made Bob Crenshaw an outstanding football player and person. Following the 2016 season, the award is given to offensive players.

Beginning in 2017, The Tallahassee Quarterback Club began sponsoring another award, known as the Monk Bonasorte Award. The award is given in the memory of Monk Bonasorte who played football from 1977 to 1980. He would later return to the university to work in the athletic department before dying of cancer. The award is given to defensive players and the recipient is also chosen by his teammates as the man who best exemplifies the qualities that made Monk Bonasorte an outstanding football player as well as person.

References

College football annual team awards by team
Awards
Florida sports-related lists